Kim Chong-kon (김종건, born March 29, 1964, in South Korea, also romanised as Kim Jong-kun) is a South Korean footballer.

Club career

International career 
He was in the squad of the 1983 FIFA World Youth Championship and the 1988 Summer Olympics.

Honours

References

External links 
 
 

Living people
K League 1 players
Ulsan Hyundai FC players
Seongnam FC players
1964 births
South Korean footballers
Footballers at the 1988 Summer Olympics
Olympic footballers of South Korea
Association football midfielders